In public finance, intragovernmental holdings (also known as intragovernmental debt or intragovernmental obligations) are debt obligations that a government owes to its own agencies. These agencies may receive or spend money unevenly throughout the year, or receive it for payout at a future date, as in the case of a pension fund. Lending the excess funds to the government, typically on the accounts of its treasury, enables the government to calculate its net cash requirements over time.

United States

In the United States, intragovernmental holdings are primarily composed of the Medicare trust funds, the Social Security Trust Fund, and Federal Financing Bank securities. A small amount of marketable securities are held by government accounts.

See also
 Government debt

US specific:
 United States public debt
 United States Treasury security
 Federal Financing Bank
Bureau of Public Debt
 Federal Reserve System
 Office of Management and Budget (OMB)

References

External links
 Treasury Direct
 Monthly Statement of the Public Debt (MSPD) and Downloadable Files, Treasury Direct
 Federal Financing Bank
 Factors Affecting Federal Reserve Balances, Federal Reserve statistical release
 Financial Management Service, A Bureau of the United States Department of the Treasury

Economy of the United States
Government debt
United States federal budgets
Government finances in the United States